Suzanne Roberts (born October 2, 1970) is an American poet, travel writer, and photographer.

Biography
Suzanne Roberts was born in New York City to a British mother and Jewish father. She grew up in Southern California and currently lives in South Lake Tahoe, California. She is the author of a collection of lyrical essays, Animal Bodies: On Death, Desire, and Other difficulties (University of Nebraska Press, 2022), the memoir in travel essays, Bad Tourist: Misadventures in Love and Travel (University of Nebraska Press, 2020), and the memoir Almost Somewhere: Twenty-Eight Days on the John Muir Trail, as well as four collections of poetry, Shameless (2007), Nothing to You (2008), Three Hours to Burn a Body: Poems on Travel (2011) and Plotting Temporality (2012).

Roberts was named "The Next Great Travel Writer" by National Geographic's Traveler, and her work has appeared in numerous magazines and journals, including Atlanta Review, The Fourth River, Matador, National Geographic's Intelligent Traveler, and National Geographic's Traveler. She received an "Honorable Mention" in the "Best Free Poetry Contest" in 2011 for her poems The Casualties of War and A Soldier's Making.

Roberts holds degrees in Biology and English from Cal Poly, San Luis Obispo, and a doctorate in English with an emphasis in Literature and the Environment from University of Nevada, Reno. She is on the MFA low residency faculty at UNR-Tahoe.

Selected works

Books

 Almost Somewhere: Twenty-Eight Days on the John Muir Trail (University of Nebraska Press, 2012)
 Shameless (Cherry Grove Collections, 2007)
 Nothing to You (Pecan Grove Press, 2008) (poem Crossing Paths)
 Three Hours to Burn a Body: Poems on Travel (Cherry Grove Collection, 2011)

Anthologies
 The Ghost of Muir Pass, The Pacific Crest Trailside Reader. The Mountaineers Press, 2011.

Awards
 National Outdoor Book Award for Almost Somewhere, Literature Category, 2012
 Eda Kriseova Fellowship for Nonfiction Writing in Prague, 2011
 Fourth River Award for Poetry, "Poulty Stall," 2009
 "The Next Great Travel Writer" Award 
 Travcoa and National Geographic Traveler, 2008

References

External links
Staff entry at Lake Tahoe Community College
Staff entry at Sierra Nevada College
 Family Skeletons: Writing about the Living and the Dead: A Discussion with Shelley Savren. Bridges: A Jewish Feminist Journal, 16.1 (Spring 2011)
 Outsiders Looking In: An Interview with Matador, Summer 2010 
 GoodReads
 Rain in Venice on Valparaiso Poetry Review

1970 births
Living people
California Polytechnic State University alumni
University of Nevada, Reno alumni
Sierra Nevada College
Jewish American journalists
American travel writers
American women travel writers
American photographers
American women photographers
American women poets
Writers from New York (state)
People from South Lake Tahoe, California
21st-century American poets
21st-century American women artists
21st-century American Jews